Richard R. Flowers (August 13, 1927 – May 7, 2010) was an American football quarterback who played for one season in the National Football League (NFL). He played for the Baltimore Colts in 1953. He played college football at Northwestern.

College career
Flowers played college football at Northwestern University where was the backup quarterback in the 1949 Rose Bowl. In 1950, Flowers became the second quarterback in school history to pass for over 1,000 yards in a season.

Military career
Following graduation, Flowers joined the United States Marine Corps and served in the Korean War.

Professional career
Flowers signed with the Green Bay Packers after serving with the Marines in 1953. He was traded to the Baltimore Colts on August 27, 1953 in exchange for an undisclosed draft pick in 1954. He played in one game for the Colts, going 2–for–4 for 18 yards.

References
3.  Sports Dept Office of Publication, Marine Corp Quantico , Virginia April 12, 1952

External links

1927 births
2010 deaths
Players of American football from South Bend, Indiana
American football quarterbacks
Northwestern Wildcats football players
Baltimore Colts players
Green Bay Packers players
United States Marine Corps personnel of the Korean War